Ashley Roberts (born September 14, 1981) is an American singer, dancer, and media personality. She is a member of the pop/R&B girl group and dance ensemble The Pussycat Dolls.

Roberts released her debut solo studio album, Butterfly Effect, in 2014. She has appeared on various British television shows, including I'm a Celebrity...Get Me Out of Here! (2012), Dancing on Ice (2013–2014), Ant & Dec's Saturday Night Takeaway (2013–2016), The Jump (2015), Strictly Come Dancing (2018), and Blankety Blank (2022).

Roberts is currently a presenter on Global's Heart 00s. She is also a showbiz reporter for Heart FM's Breakfast show with Jamie Theakston and Amanda Holden. She also hosted the Netflix show Dance Monsters.

Life and career

1981–2002: Early life and career beginnings
Roberts was born in Phoenix, Arizona, and attended Shadow Mountain High School. She began dancing at the age of three and singing at eight. Roberts' father was a drummer for the Mamas & the Papas, later becoming an auto dealer and her mother was a Pilates instructor. They both inspired her to be a part of the entertainment industry.

Roberts' hair was brunette during her teenage years, as shown in Aaron Carter's "Oh Aaron" and "Not Too Young, Not Too Old" music videos.

During high school summer breaks, Roberts traveled to California to study modern dance. After high school, at 19 years old, she moved permanently to Los Angeles. Roberts has appeared in television commercials and music videos such as Counting Crows "Accidentally in Love", Josh Groban's "You Raise Me Up", Jane's Addiction's "True Nature", Aaron Carter's "Oh Aaron" and "Not Too Young, Not Too Old" and Pink's "Trouble". Roberts cites Goldie Hawn, Kate Moss, Sienna Miller and Gwen Stefani as her main role models and inspirations.

2003–2010: The Pussycat Dolls

Within six months of her move, Roberts auditioned for the Pussycat Dolls. At that time the Pussycat Dolls were an underground modern burlesque troupe. Following their growing popularity, music producers Jimmy Iovine and Ron Fair became involved with the group helping them to transform into a franchise. The former dance troupe evolved into a pop music recording group. The only troupe members who remained after the re-casting process were Robin Antin (taking on the creative, executive and managerial roles), Carmit Bachar, Cyia Batten, Kasey Campbell, Kimberly Wyatt, Jessica Sutta and Ashley Roberts. After a few more auditions, singers Nicole Scherzinger, Melody Thornton and Kaya Jones were added to the line-up. In 2004, they recorded "We Went as Far as We Felt Like Going" for the Shark Tale soundtrack and recorded the single, "Sway" which is featured on the soundtrack of Shall We Dance?. Jones left the group in 2005, Batten and Campbell had left earlier.

The Pussycat Dolls were launched into mainstream recognition following the release of PCD (2005), which contained the number-one singles "Don't Cha", "Buttons" and "Stickwitu". Roberts sang co-lead with Bachar and Sutta in the "Stickwitu" single B-side, "Santa Baby". Bachar's departure from the group preceded the release of their second and final studio album, Doll Domination, which contains hit singles, "When I Grow Up", "I Hate This Part" and "Jai Ho! (You Are My Destiny)". Roberts recorded a solo song called "Played" for the Doll Dominations deluxe edition.

On January 29, 2010, Jessica Sutta revealed to E! Online that she had been ousted from the group, following a broken rib she sustained whilst on tour with the group, and thus confirmed her exit.[53] On February 26, Kimberly Wyatt confirmed she was also leaving the group.[54] The next day, Ashley Roberts announced her departure from the group via her website.[53] In a letter to her fans, she made the following announcement:

Wyatt would later go on to confirm that all of the members had left the group, including Melody Thornton.[55] Despite these changes, on May 24, a rumored third line-up would join Scherzinger.[56] However, in late 2010, Scherzinger officially left the group to pursue a solo career.[57] As a result, the original recording group line-up had officially disbanded. The group has sold 54 million records worldwide, making them one of the best-selling girl groups of all time.[2][3]

Roberts made her film debut as Brooke in the dance film Make It Happen with actress Mary Elizabeth Winstead and Riley Smith. Production lasted from August 8 to September 17, 2007, and the film was directed by Darren Grant and distributed by The Weinstein Company. It premièred on August 8, 2008, in the UK to generally negative reviews.

2010–2018: Solo career and Butterfly Effect

After leaving the Dolls, Roberts traveled around the world, followed guru Amma and took several dance/acting classes. In 2010, Roberts released her first solo song, a cover of "A Summer Place" and was released on iTunes on September 28. Roberts also made an appearance in ex-bandmate Wyatt's music video for the single, "Stars in Your Eyes". On June 14, 2012, she made a cameo appearance in Bobby Newberry's music video for his debut single "Dirrty Up", with ex-bandmate Melody Thornton. On October 10, 2012, Roberts released a preview of a cover version of Bobby Newberry's "All In A Day", produced by the Invaders. The full version was released at the end of October. On November 5, 2012, Roberts announced that her first official solo single would be "Yesterday"  and would be released that week.

On November 7, 2012, it was confirmed that Roberts would compete in the twelfth series of the British reality show I'm a Celebrity...Get Me Out of Here!, airing on ITV finishing as runner-up to Charlie Brooks. Despite not winning, she proved to be a popular public figure during her time on the show and it launched her solo career in the United Kingdom.

On May 25, 2014, Roberts' single "Clockwork" was released. On September 1, 2014, Roberts' debut album, Butterfly Effect, recorded at Metropolis in Chiswick, London was released. It was preceded by new single "Woman Up".

In late 2018, Roberts appeared on Strictly Come Dancing in the United Kingdom and finished as a finalist.

2019–present: The Pussycat Dolls reunion 

In June 2019, Roberts became the showbiz correspondent of the Heart Breakfast, a British radio show hosted by Jamie Theakston and Amanda Holden. That following month, she made her West End debut, portraying Dawn, in the musical, Waitress. On November 29, 2019, after months of speculation for a possible Pussycat Dolls reunion, Roberts along with Bachar, Scherzinger, Sutta, and Wyatt confirmed their reunion on Heart radio station, where they also announced a tour originally scheduled for 2020. A live performance on the finale of The X Factor: Celebrity followed, which included a medley of previous singles and their new song, "React". British media regulator Ofcom received over 400 complaints from viewers who criticized the band's perceived provocative nature of their performance.

"React" was released in February 2020 to moderate success. The Pussycat Dolls reunion tour was officially cancelled in January 2022.

Other ventures

Television
On her official blog, Roberts announced that she would work on a variety of projects. She worked on her acting, and was a host on Maxim Does Spring Break on E!. Roberts also shot a pilot for MTV with Aubrey O'Day, Marques Houston, and Amanda Ghost.

She appeared on 90210 in the episode "Into the Wild" which aired on November 5, 2010, where she played a stripper.

On November 7, 2012, it was confirmed that Roberts would compete in the twelfth series of the British reality show I'm a Celebrity...Get Me Out of Here!. She finished as the runner-up behind Charlie Brooks.

In December 2012, it was confirmed that Roberts would be one of the judges on the British celebrity skating show Dancing on Ice, from its eighth series. She returned as a judge for its ninth series in 2014.

She hosted the Ant vs Dec segment on the revived version of Ant & Dec's Saturday Night Takeaway from 2013 to 2016. She also hosted 1st Look on NBC from 2016 until 2018.

In 2014, she hosted WWE Legends' House, a show which featured several wrestling legends living together and Roberts would provide them daily challenges. It is streamed exclusively on the WWE Network.

In December 2014, Roberts was announced as a contestant for the second series of The Jump. She was eliminated in the second week.

Roberts served as a guest judge on BBC One's Let It Shine in February 2017.

Roberts appeared alongside Jamie Theakston on Channel 4's Celebrity Gogglebox in 2020.

Strictly Come Dancing 

On August 17, 2018, it was announced that Roberts would be a contestant on the sixteenth series of Strictly Come Dancing. Her professional partner was Pasha Kovalev. They finished as joint runners-up to winners Stacey Dooley and Kevin Clifton on December 15, 2018.

Score awarded by guest judge Alfonso Ribeiro *
Green number indicates Ashley and Pasha were at the top of the leaderboard

Products and endorsements
In March 2013, Roberts was announced as Garnier's new self-tan spokesmodel and the face of Ambre Solaire No Streak Bronzer campaign.

Roberts has launched her first line of lingerie designed for the beach in Sydney, Australia.

In 2016, Roberts designed a women's shoe collection for spring/summer 2017 called ALLYN, after her middle name.

Discography

 Butterfly Effect (2014)

Filmography

Film

Television

Awards and nominations

See also
 List of I'm a Celebrity...Get Me Out of Here! (British TV series) contestants
 List of Strictly Come Dancing contestants

Notes

References

External links

 Official website
 Official Twitter
 Official YouTube

1981 births
American expatriates in England
American people of English descent
American film actresses
American people of Welsh descent
American television actresses
American female dancers
Dancers from Arizona
Dance teachers
American choreographers
American contemporary R&B singers
American women pop singers
The Pussycat Dolls members
Actresses from Phoenix, Arizona
Living people
A&M Records artists
Interscope Records artists
Metropolis Records artists
21st-century American singers
21st-century American women singers
I'm a Celebrity...Get Me Out of Here! (British TV series) participants